Jayatilleke de Silva (Sinhala:ජයතිලක ද සිල්වා) (14 June 1938 – 26 February 2019) was a Sri Lankan author, translator, journalist and a JVP activist.

Early life and education

De Silva was born in Ambalangoda-Batapola, Nindana Village in 1938 and commenced his preliminary studies at Hikkaduwa Central College. Then he continued his further studies in Mathematics from the University of Ceylon, Colombo. He chose his initial profession to be teaching. After a short period as the Principal of Deniyaya Central College, he left the teaching to pursue a full-time career in politics.

Political career

He started his political career from the Sri Lanka Communist Party, of which he was an active member for a few decades. He got remanded for many years trying to topple the government under terrorism act during 1980s. In mid 1980s he and majority of its members left the Communist Party and Socialist People's Movement (සමාජවාදි ජනතා ව්‍යාපාරය Samajawadi Janatha Wyapraya) was formed. During the later stages he devoted his time to helping and was actively engaged forming the yahapalana government with Janatha Vimukthi Peramuna. Soon after De Silva's death, his wife who is an active member of the JVP, Sunila Nandani Dias donated de Silva’s library to JVP. 

De Silva was an active committee member of the Sri Lanka Committee for Solidarity with Palestine, and the Journalists for Global Justice organization.

Journalism career

His first foray into journalism was from the Aththa newspaper of the Communist Party. As editor of Mawbima and Forward newspapers, he dedicated most of his time to the party's ideological and youth activities. He later joined the Daily News newspaper in the late 1990s and continued his journalism in English medium. De Silva's bilingual writing ability paved the way for him to become the Editor in Chief of the Daily News in year 2001. Later he was appointed the Chief Editor of the Sunday Observer in 2003.
However his articles during his later tenure in support of Liberation Tigers of Tamil Eelam suspects stating that "LTTE suspects are political prisoners" was a major controversial statement in his career as majority of the Sinhalese community started demeaning his allegation. He was dismissed from the editorial post from the lake house.

Author
De Silva translated the three volume Karl Marx's treatise on the socialist model, Das Kapital to Sinhala while actively engaging with JVP activities. He contributed to the panel of judges to select the best translations of the year at several literary festivals organized by the State Literary Advisory board during yahapalana government.

Bibliography

References

1938 births
2019 deaths
20th-century Sri Lankan writers
21st-century Sri Lankan writers
Alumni of the University of Ceylon (Colombo)
Communist Party of Sri Lanka politicians
English-language writers from Sri Lanka
People from Galle District
People from British Ceylon
Sinhalese journalists
Sinhalese teachers
Sinhalese writers
Sri Lankan editors
Sri Lankan translators
20th-century translators